Anna Kallina (31 March 1874 – 4 January 1948) was an Austrian stage and film actress. She played the role of Anne, Queen of Great Britain, in the 1921 film The Grinning Face (1921).

Kallina first began acting on the state in the 1870s.

Selected filmography
 The Grinning Face (1921)
 Die Totenhand (1921)
 Meriota the Dancer (1922)
 Look After Your Daughters (1922)
 The Right to Live (1927)
 The Family without Morals (1927)
 The Woman of Yesterday and Tomorrow (1928)
 Wiener Herzen (1930)
 Gently My Songs Entreat (1933)
 Lover Divine (1933)
 Her Highness Dances the Waltz (1935)
 The Affairs of Maupassant (1935)
 Where the Lark Sings (1936)

References

Bibliography
 Gleizes, Delphine. L' oeuvre de Victor Hugo à l'écran: des rayons et des ombres. Presses Université Laval, 2005.

External links

1874 births
1948 deaths
19th-century Austrian actresses
Austrian stage actresses
Austrian film actresses
Austrian silent film actresses
Actresses from Vienna
20th-century Austrian actresses
Actresses from the Austro-Hungarian Empire